Giulio Giuricich (born 5 February 1990 in Johannesburg, Gauteng) is a South African footballer, who last played as a left-back for Moroka Swallows in the Premier Soccer League.

Career 
Giuricich left his native South Africa at the age of 18 and joined the land of his forefathers, Italy. He joined to Serie A Side US Sassuolo Calcio on trial, but he failed a contract and signed a half-year loan deal with Serie C club AC Montichiari. In his two years with AC Montichiari, Giuricich played two games and moved in summer 2010 to League rival AC Castellana. He played three games in the Serie D with AC Castellana and signed in winter 2011 with S.G. Gallaratese.

He signed for Swallows during the 2012–13 season, after a successful month-long trial. Giuricich played six months with the Swallows and left the club in April 2013. He rejoined Swallows in February 2014 following a successful recovery from an injury.

Personal life 
His sister is the TBS Group Spa business woman Simonetta Giuricich.

References

1990 births
Living people
Association football defenders
Moroka Swallows F.C. players
Soccer players from Johannesburg
South African soccer players
White South African people
South African people of Italian descent
South African expatriate soccer players
Expatriate footballers in Italy
South African expatriate sportspeople in Italy
S.G. Gallaratese A.S.D. players